Port Shepstone Secondary School is a public co-educational high school in Port Shepstone in KwaZulu-Natal, South Africa.

History
The school officially opened in 1961 and is run by the KwaZulu-Natal Department of Education and a governing body.

Principals
Mrs. Shireen Ramkelawon : 2008 – 30 April 2015Mr. G Odayar : 30 April 2015–

References

Schools in KwaZulu-Natal
High schools in South Africa